The fourth and last season of Vis a Vis premiered on 3 December 2018 and ended on 4 February 2019 consisting of 8 episodes. Produced by  Globomedia and broadcast by Fox Spain.

Season four deals with the aftermath of Zulema (Najwa Nimri), Saray (Alba Flores) and Altagracia's (Adriana Paz) escape. Altagracia who used to terrorize the inmates as prison guard is now one of them. Zulema and Saray who was once bestfriends are now each other's enemies. Dr. Sandoval (Ramiro Blas) is the new Director of Cruz del Norte, who enforced violence to tame the inmates making the prison dangerous more than ever. We see Saray as a mother who would do anything for her child and Zulema who be revealed to be a mother. Soledad Nunez (María Isabel Díaz Lago) is revealed to have Alzheimer's disease. Macarena (Maggie Civantos) goes out finally up from her coma.

Cast and characters

Cruz Del Norte Inmates 
Najwa Nimri as Zulema Zahir
Maggie Civantos as Macarena Ferreiro (Episodes 7-8)
Berta Vázquez as Estefania "Rizos" Kabila 
Alba Flores as Saray Vargas de Jesús 
 María Isabel Díaz Lago as Soledad "Sole" Núñez Hurtado
Marta Aledo as  Teresa "Tere" González Largo
Laura Baena as Antonia Trujillo Díez - 
Itziar Castro as Goya Fernández 
Abril Zamora as Luna Garrido

Cruz del Norte Employees 
 Adriana Paz as Altagracia Guerrero 
 Cristina Marcos as Magdalena Cruz 
 Benjamín Vicuña as Antonio Hierro 
 Alberto Velasco as Antonio Palacios Lloret

Police Force 
Jesús Castejón as Inspector Damián Castillo

Recurring Cast and Guest 
Georgina Amorós as Fátima Amin 
Édgar Vittorino as a male prisoner 
Mala Rodriguez as Saray's girlfriend.
Zaira Pérez as Nuria Millán
Nahara Calero as Estrella Vargas 
Juan Blanco as Alfonso "El Piti" 
Farah Hamed as Zulema's mother 
Miriam Rodríguez as an inmate part of the choral group.

Episodes

References

2010s Spanish television series
2018 Spanish television seasons
2019 Spanish television seasons
Spanish crime television series